Cruise is the phase of aircraft flight that starts when the aircraft levels off after a climb, until it begins to descend for landing. Cruising usually consumes the majority of a flight, and it may include changes in heading (direction of flight), airspeed and altitude.

Commercial or passenger aircraft are usually designed for optimum performance around their cruise speed (VC) and cruise altitude. Factors affecting optimum cruise speed and altitude include payload, center of gravity, air temperature, and humidity. Cruise altitude is usually where the higher ground speed is balanced against the decrease in engine thrust and efficiency at higher altitudes.

The speed which covers the greatest distance for a given amount of fuel is known as the maximum range speed. This is the speed at which drag is minimised.

For jet aircraft, "long-range cruise" speed (LRC) is defined as the speed which gives 99% of the maximum range, for a given weight. This results in a 3-5% increase in speed. It is also a more stable speed than Maximum Range Speed, so gives less autothrottle movement. However, LRC speed does not take account of winds, or time-related costs other than fuel, so it has little practical value. Instead, the speed for most economical operation (ECON) is adjusted for wind and the cost index (CI), which is the ratio of time cost to fuel cost. A higher cost index results in a higher ECON speed. A typical cost index in these units might be anywhere from 5 to 150. In the presence of a tailwind, ECON airspeed will be reduced to take advantage of the tailwind, whereas in a headwind, ECON speed will be increased to avoid the penalty of the headwind. In a strong tailwind, the aircraft can fly at a low speed to conserve fuel, while the tailwind does most of the work getting the aircraft to its destination. In an area of strong headwind, the aircraft should fly faster to pass through that region sooner. In the presence of a tailwind, LRC speed may give a higher fuel burn than ECON. As the aircraft consumes fuel, its weight decreases and the ECON speed decreases. This is because a heavier aircraft should fly faster to complete the trip more quickly. ECON speed will also be higher at higher altitudes.

For propeller aircraft, drag is minimised when the lift-to-drag ratio is maximised. However, the speed for this is typically regarded as too slow, so propeller aircraft typically cruise at a significantly faster speed. Combustion engines have an optimum efficiency level for fuel consumption and power output. Generally, gasoline piston engines are most efficient between idle speed and 30% short of full throttle. Diesels are most efficient at around 90% of full throttle.

As the aircraft consumes fuel, its weight decreases and the optimum altitude for fuel economy increases. For traffic control reasons it is usually necessary for an aircraft to stay at a cleared flight level. On long-haul flights, the pilot may ask air traffic control to climb from one flight level to a higher one, in a manoeuvre known as a step climb.

See also 
 Fuel economy in aircraft
 Range (aeronautics)
 Lift-to-drag ratio
 Supercruise
 Takeoff
 Visual flight rules

References 

Flight phases